Post-amendment to the Tamil Nadu Entertainment Tax Act 1939 on 27 September 2011, Gross jumped to 130 per cent of Nett for films with non-Tamil titles and U certificates as well. Commercial Taxes Department disclosed 85.81 crore in entertainment tax revenue for the year. According to the FICCI-EY media and entertainment industry report, the Tamil film segment registered domestic nett box office receipts of 946 crore with 12.6 crore admissions.

Box office collection 
The highest-grossing Kollywood films released in 2016, by worldwide box office gross revenue, are as follows.

Released films

January – July

July – December

Dubbed films

Awards

Notable deaths 
J.Jayalalitha  — 5 December
Cho Ramaswamy - 7 December

Notes

References

Tamil
2016
Tamil
2010s Tamil-language films